The russet antshrike (Thamnistes anabatinus) is a passerine bird in the antbird family. 

It is a resident breeder in the tropical New World from southern Mexico to northern Bolivia.

It is a bird of forest, old second growth, semi-open woodland and edges up to  altitude. Nest-building, incubation, and care of the young are shared by both sexes.

It has a heavy hooked bill and brown upperparts, becoming rufous on the wings and tail. It has a dark eyestripe and a buff supercilium. The underparts are olive buff. Sexes are similar, but the male has a concealed rufous-orange patch in the centre of his back. Young birds are similar to the adults, but have rufous fringes to the wing coverts and are paler below. The call is a squeaky sweek, and the song is cheep cheep CHEEP CHEEP cheep.

The russet antshrike feeds on insects and other arthropods, which it gleans from foliage like a vireo. It may be seen alone, in pairs, or with tanagers and warblers in mixed-species feeding flocks

The russet antshrike was described by the English ornithologists Philip Sclater and Osbert Salvin in 1860. They erected the genus Thamnistes to accommodate the species and coined the binomial name Thamnistes anabatinus. The specific epithet is from the Ancient Greek anabatēs meaning "climber" or "mounter".

References

Further reading

russet antshrike
Birds of Central America
Birds of the Tumbes-Chocó-Magdalena
Birds of the Northern Andes
russet antshrike
russet antshrike
russet antshrike